Euodynerus hidalgo is a species of potter or mason wasp in the family Vespidae.

Subspecies
 Euodynerus hidalgo boreoorientalis (Bequaert, 1937)
 Euodynerus hidalgo hidalgo 
 Euodynerus hidalgo viereckii (Cameron, 1909)

References

Further reading

 "Phylogenetic relationships among superfamilies of Hymenoptera", Sharkey M.J., Carpenter J.M., Vilhelmsen L., et al. 2012. Cladistics 28(1): 80–112.
 Piekarski PK, Carpenter JM, Sharanowski BJ (2017). "New species of Ancistrocerus (Vespidae, Eumeninae) from the Neotropics with a checklist and key to all species south of the Rio Grande". ZooKeys 718: 139–154.
 Sharkey M.J. (2007). Phylogeny and Classification of Hymenoptera.

Potter wasps
Insects described in 1857